Brown huntsman spider may refer to:
 Heteropoda venatoria, a pantropical species of spider
 Heteropoda cervina, a large Australian species of spider
 Other species in the genus Heteropoda

Set index articles on spiders